The Yacht Club of Poland (officially Yacht Klubu Polski) is a yacht club in Poland. It's a member of the Polish Yachting Association.

History
The Club was founded December 10, 1924 under the name Polish Yacht Club (from 1925 Yacht Club of Poland) as a nationwide organization with the right to create branches. The action began with the sailors in Warsaw under the chairmanship of Antoni Aleksandrowicz. Branches were created including in Warsaw, Gdynia, and other cities. One of the founders and first commandant was Mariusz Zaruski.

References

External links
 Official website (in polish)

Yacht clubs in Poland
Clubs and societies in Poland
1924 establishments in Poland